Muhammad Faiz bin Dato' Haji Fadzil is a Malaysian politician. He has been the member of Penang State Legislative Assembly for Permatang Pasir since 2018.

Early career 
He is also the owner of a law firm, Faiz Fadzil & Co in Seremban, Negeri Sembilan.

Politics 
He is the member of AMANAH National Committee for 2019-2022.  He is seen as the future leader to replace Mohamad Sabu and Mahfuz Omar in AMANAH to spread moderate Islam, following his father, Fadzil Noor's will.

He was the Chairman Lembaga Kemajuan Ikan Malaysia replacing Irmohizam Ibrahim in 2018 and was replaced by Syed Abu Hussin Hafiz in 2020.

Election result

Personal life 
He is the son of former President of PAS, Fadzil bin Mohd Noor.

Controversies 
On 10 June 2021, he was charged for sexually assaulting a saleswomen.

Reference 

National Trust Party (Malaysia) politicians
1977 births
Living people